Joseph Novales (23 July 1937 – 23 March 1985) was a French professional cyclist. He was professional from 1962 until 1966.

Biography
Joseph Novales was born in Torralba de Aragón on March 23, 1937 and died in Libreville, France at the age of 47. He was accorded the citizenship of France in 1950.

Career
He competed in three Tour de France editions, between 1962 and 1966. His cycling career spanned 5 seasons, from 1962 to 1966, in which he obtained a total of 13 victories.

Major results

1962
 3rd Overall Tour de Romandie
1st Stage 1b
1963
 1st  Overall Volta a Catalunya
 1st Trofeo Baracchi
 1st Circuito du Morbihan
 2nd GP du Parisien 
1964
 1st Trofeo Jaumendreu
 1st Stage 5 Critérium du Dauphiné
 3rd Overall Critérium International
1st Stage 2
 9th Overall Tour de Romandie
1965
 1st Stage 1 Vuelta a Andalucía

Grand Tour results

Tour de France
 1962: DNF
 1964: 19th
 1966: DNF

Vuelta a España results
 1965: DNF

References

External links
 

1937 births
1985 deaths
Spanish male cyclists
French male cyclists
Volta a Catalunya cyclists
Spanish emigrants to France
Sportspeople from the Province of Huesca
Cyclists from Aragon